The lac au Lard is the main body of water on the slope of the ruisseau du Lac au Lard, located in Haute-Batiscanie, in the town of La Tuque, in the administrative region of Mauricie, in Quebec, in Canada.

Forestry is the main economic activity in the sector; recreational activities, second.

The surface of Lac au Lard is generally frozen from the beginning of December to the end of March; however, safe circulation on the ice is generally from late December to early March.

Geography 

This lake is made in length.

Lac au Lard has several small bays.

Toponymy 
The toponym "lac au Lard" was formalized on December 5, 1968, at the Place Names Bank of the Commission de toponymie du Québec.

See also 
 Batiscanie
 Zec de la Bessonne, a controlled harvesting zone (zec)
 St. Lawrence River, a stream
 List of rivers of Quebec

References

External links 

Lakes of Mauricie
La Tuque, Quebec